Holger Trimhold (born 13 June 1953) is a retired German football midfielder. He is the younger brother of Horst Trimhold.

References

External links
 

1953 births
Living people
People from Wolfhagen
Sportspeople from Kassel (region)
German footballers
Bundesliga players
2. Bundesliga players
VfL Bochum players
Eintracht Braunschweig players
PAOK FC players
Expatriate footballers in Greece
Association football midfielders
Footballers from Hesse
German expatriate footballers
German expatriate sportspeople in Greece
Super League Greece players